Brant Anderson Gardner (born 1951) is an American researcher, writer and speaker on the Book of Mormon, and Mesoamerican studies.

Biographical background
Gardner is a member of the Church of Jesus Christ of Latter-day Saints.  From 1971 to 1973, he served as a missionary for the church in the Spain Madrid Mission.

Gardner received a B.A. in University Studies from Brigham Young University in 1975, and an M.A. in Anthropology from the State University of New York, Albany (SUNY) in 1978.  From 1978–80, Gardner continued at SUNY, completing all the course work, but not exams or a dissertation, toward a Ph.D. in Mesoamerican ethnohistory.

In Mesoamerican studies, Gardner has published on classical Nahuatl kinship terminology, ethnohistoric investigation of Coxoh in southern Mexico, and the Aztec Legend of the Suns.  He has published with the New World Archaeological Foundation and the Institute for Mesoamerican Studies.

Professionally, Gardner has worked in software consulting and product management.

Gardner lives in Albuquerque, New Mexico.

Mormon studies
Gardner has published widely on the Book of Mormon and its possible geographical settings.  He has often written for the FARMS Review of Books and has presented in the conferences of the Foundation for Apologetic Information & Research (FAIR) during 2000–4, and 2008.  In 2007 he presented on "DNA and the Book of Mormon" to the Book of Mormon Archaeological Forum.

Gardner is the author of Second Witness: Analytical & Contextual Commentary on the Book of Mormon, published by Greg Kofford Books in 2007.  This six-volume commentary on the Book of Mormon focuses on its spiritual, theological, cultural, textual, and historical context.  For years much of this work was presented online as The Multi-dimensional Commentary on the Book of Mormon, which Gardner further revised for publication and took offline.

Published works

Sources

External links
Bio page from FARMS
"Likening With Care" - articles about Gardner's work in 2008

1951 births
20th-century Mormon missionaries
20th-century Mesoamericanists
21st-century Mesoamericanists
American Mesoamericanists
American Mormon missionaries in Spain
Brigham Young University alumni
Living people
Mormon apologists
Writers from Albuquerque, New Mexico
University at Albany, SUNY alumni
Latter Day Saints from New Mexico
Latter Day Saints from New York (state)
Latter Day Saints from Utah
Missionary linguists